Virada Nirapathpongporn (born 21 April 1982) is a Thai former professional golfer who won the 2003 U.S. Women's Amateur.

Nirapathpongporn was born in Bangkok, Thailand. She attended Duke University, where she won the 2002 NCAA Division I Championship. She graduated in 2004 with BA degree in psychology. She was voted the 2004 Nancy Lopez Award as the world's top female amateur. She was also runner-up in the 2003 U.S. Women's Amateur Public Links. In 2002, she also won the Honda Sports Award as the best female collegiate golfer in the nation.

Nirapathpongporn turned professional in June 2004 to play on the Futures Tour. In 2005, she won two tournaments. In 2006, she was an LPGA Tour rookie and wrote a blog for lpga.com.

In late February 2011, Nirapathpongporn announced she would be retiring from competitive golf and moving back to Thailand after living in the United States for fifteen years.

Amateur wins
2001 Women's Trans-National Championship
2002 NCAA Division I Championship
2003 U.S. Women's Amateur

Professional wins (2)

Futures Tour wins (2)
2005 (2) Jalapeno FUTURES Golf Classic, CIGNA Chip in For A Cure Connecticut FUTURES Golf Classic

References

External links

Rookie blog

Virada Nirapathpongporn
Duke Blue Devils women's golfers
LPGA Tour golfers
Winners of ladies' major amateur golf championships
Golfers at the 2002 Asian Games
Virada Nirapathpongporn
Virada Nirapathpongporn
Golfers from Orlando, Florida
1982 births
Living people
Virada Nirapathpongporn